Mother and Child (German: Mutter und Kind) is a 1924 German silent drama film directed by Carl Froelich and starring Henny Porten, Friedrich Kayßler, and Wilhelm Dieterle. It was shot at the EFA Studios in Berlin. It was remade in 1934 as a sound film of the same title also starring Porten.

Cast
Henny Porten as Köchin Lene
Friedrich Kayßler as Senator Hansen
Wilhelm Dieterle as Kutscher Christian
Erna Morena as Renate, Senator Hansen's Frau
Willy Fritsch as Werner, Senator Hansen's Neffe
Wilhelm Diegelmann as Hausarzt
Arnold Rieck as Schuster
Hanne Brinkmann as Schusterin
 as Pastor
Loni Nest as Kind

References

Bibliography
 Bock, Hans-Michael & Bergfelder, Tim. The Concise CineGraph. Encyclopedia of German Cinema. Berghahn Books, 2009.

External links 
 

1924 films
Films of the Weimar Republic
German drama films
German silent feature films
Films directed by Carl Froelich
1924 drama films
German black-and-white films
Bavaria Film films
Silent drama films
Films shot at Halensee Studios
1920s German films
1920s German-language films